FK Jelgava is a Latvian football club that is based in Jelgava. The club plays its home-matches at the Zemgales Olimpiskais Sporta Centrs stadium with capacity of 1,560 people.

Early years
Until 2004 two Jelgava football clubs FK Viola and RAF Jelgava played in 1. līga. In 2004, it was made decision to merge both clubs into one forming FK Jelgava. FK Jelgava has played since their foundation in  2004 in the 1. līga, but in 2009 after winning the Latvian First League the team had the chance to play their first games in the Virslīga.

On 19 May 2010 FK Jelgava won the Latvian Cup final in Skonto Stadium, beating FK Jūrmala-VV 6:5 in a penalty shoot out after the game had finished 0:0.

On the way to the final, the club beat FK Liepājas Metalurgs in the quarter-finals and Skonto FC in the semi-finals.

Victory in the Latvian Cup final allowed FK Jelgava to debut in the UEFA Europa League tournament. In the second qualifying round FK Jelgava played Molde FK from Norway. With a score of 2:2 on aggregate, Molde won on away goals.

In the 2010 season Jelgava was the only Latvian football club which won a game in European football tournaments (2:1 against Molde).

On 2 September 2010 FK Jelgava played a friendly against Premier League club Blackpool. The match marked the opening of the Olympic Sports Center of Zemgale. The President of Latvia Valdis Zatlers and the British Ambassador in Latvia attended the game.

Honours

Latvia
Latvian Higher League
Runners-Up (1): 2016
Latvian Cup
Winners (4): 2009–10, 2013–14, 2014–15, 2015–16

League and Cup history

European record

Players and staff

Current squad
As of 4 February, 2023

Out on loan

Staff

Managers
  Dainis Kazakevičs (2004 – 2012)
  Jānis Dreimanis (2013)
  Sergejs Golubevs (interim) (2013)
  Sergejs Golubevs (2013)
  Vladimirs Beškarevs (2014)
  Dāvis Caune (interim) (June 2014)
  Vitālijs Astafjevs (June 2014 – May 2016)
  Dāvis Caune (interim) (May 2016 - June 2016)
  Saulius Širmelis (June 2016 – December 2016)
  Alexandru Curteian (December 2016 – August 2017)
  Dāvis Caune (interim) (August 2017)
  Ravil Sabitov (August 2017  - May 2018)
  Marians Pahars (June 2018  - June 2019)
  Oleg Kubarev (June 2019  - August 2020)
  Dāvis Caune (interim) (August 2020 -)

Player of the season (since 2013)

References

External links
  FK Jelgava Official Site
  Official Latvian Football Federation website

 
Jelgava
Jelgava
2004 establishments in Latvia